Francis North may refer to:
Francis North, 1st Baron Guilford (1637–1685)
Francis North, 2nd Baron Guilford (1673–1729), British peer
Francis North, 1st Earl of Guilford (1704–1790), British peer and politician
Francis North, 4th Earl of Guilford (1761–1817), British peer, army officer, and playwright
Francis North, 6th Earl of Guilford (1772–1861)
Francis North (Australian politician) (1811–1864), member of the Queensland Legislative Council